Asperula involucrata is a species of flowering plant in the family Rubiaceae.

Description 
Asperula involucrata is endemic to Bulgaria and Turkey.

References 

involucrata